Roger Carter may refer to:

Roger Carter (American football), American football player
Roger Carter (academic) (1922–2009), law professor and Dean, Faculty of Law, University of Saskatchewan
Roger Carter (darts player) (born 1961), American darts player
Roger Carter (mathematician) (1934–2022), British mathematician and author
Roger Carter (Marxist-Leninist candidate), Canadian political candidate